The Hon. William Stuart Knox DL, JP (11 March 1826 – 16 February 1900), was an Irish politician.

Background
Knox was a younger son of Thomas Knox, 2nd Earl of Ranfurly, and Mary Juliana, daughter of the Most Reverend William Stuart, Archbishop of Armagh.

Political and military career
Knox was elected Member of Parliament for Dungannon in 1851 (succeeding his elder brother Viscount Northland), a seat he held until 1874. He was a Groom in Waiting to Queen Victoria in 1852 and 1853.

Commissioned into the 51st Foot, he retired as a major in 1855. From 1867 he was Honorary Colonel in the Mid Ulster Artillery, and he served as a Deputy Lieutenant and Justice of the Peace for County Tyrone.

Family
Knox married in 1856 Georgiana Rooper, daughter of John Bonfoy Rooper, of Ripton Hall, Huntingdon. They had several children. He died at Cheltenham on 16 February 1900, aged 73. His wife survived him by 26 years and died in November 1926.

References

External links 
 

1826 births
1900 deaths
Younger sons of earls
Members of the Parliament of the United Kingdom for County Tyrone constituencies (1801–1922)
UK MPs 1852–1857
UK MPs 1857–1859
UK MPs 1859–1865
UK MPs 1865–1868
UK MPs 1868–1874
Deputy Lieutenants of Tyrone